Masuko (written: 益子) is both a Japanese surname and a feminine Japanese given name. Notable people with the name include:

, Japanese photographer
, Japanese business executive
, Japanese footballer
, Japanese violinist

Japanese-language surnames
Japanese feminine given names